The 1996 Campeonato Paulista de Futebol Profissional da Primeira Divisão - Série A1 was the 95th season of São Paulo's top professional football league. Palmeiras won the championship by the 21st time. Ferroviária, Novorizontino and XV de Jaú were relegated.

Championship
The championship was disputed in a double round-robin format, with the winners of the first and second rounds of the championship qualifying to the finals; In case that the same team won both rounds, it would automatically win the title.

First round

Second round

Final standings

Top Scores

References

Campeonato Paulista seasons
Paulista